Egesina fujiwarai is a species of beetle in the family Cerambycidae. It was described by Toyoshima in 1999.

References

Egesina
Beetles described in 1999